This is a list of rural localities in Ryazan Oblast. Ryazan Oblast is a federal subject of Russia (an oblast). Its administrative center is the city of Ryazan, which is the oblast's largest city. Population: 1,154,114 (2010 Census).

Locations 
 12 let Oktyabrya
 Abakumovo
 Abryutino
 Abryutinskie Vyselki
 Avangard
 Avdotyinka
 Azeyevo
 Plakhino
 Putyatino
 Seltsy
 Zakharovo

See also 
 
 Lists of rural localities in Russia

References 

Ryazan Oblast